A Parental Responsibility Order is a court order in the United Kingdom that is granted in order to confer parental responsibility upon an individual. Their statutory basis is the Children Act 1989 s4(1).

See also
Prohibited Steps Order
Child Arrangement Order

References

Family law in the United Kingdom
Parental responsibility (access and custody)